Akhtar Hussain Albela (21 September 1940 – 17 July 2004) was a Pakistani actor and comedian.

Albela died of a heart failure at age 63 in Lahore on 17 July 2004.

Early life and career
Albela was born in Gojra, Punjab, British India (now in Toba Tek Singh District, Punjab, Pakistan) in 1940. He performed in numerous films, television and theater plays in his career spanning over 50 years. Some of his hit Punjabi films were Bharia Mela (1966), Badnam (1966), Baoo Ji (1968) and Ishq Nachaway Gali Gali (1984).

He has 7 daughters and two sons. His son, Honey Albela has worked in comedy shows on Geo TV, Aap TV and Express TV. Albela is widely recognized as a stage actor who transformed Pakistani stage acting.

Death and legacy
He died on 17 July 2004 in Lahore. Before his death, Albela was admitted to the Ittefaq Hospital, Lahore, when he had heart and liver problems. He was buried in Green Town, Mian Chowk Graveyard, Lahore, Punjab, Pakistan.

Discography
 Kali Meri Pagg Tey Gulabi Shalwar Jee (Albela with Masood Rana, song from film Allah Ditta (1988)), music by M Ashraf
 Ik Wadh Gaya Hor Zanana Sheikh Javed Warga - Albela with A Nayyar (song about Javed Sheikh from film Siren).

Filmography

Awards and recognition
Nigar Award as Best Comedian for the Punjabi-language film Hoshyar (1990)

See also 
 List of Lollywood actors

References

External links
 

1940 births
2004 deaths
People from Toba Tek Singh District
Punjabi people
Pakistani male film actors
Pakistani male stage actors
Pakistani male comedians
Male actors from Lahore
20th-century comedians
Nigar Award winners